Buesa is a locality located in the municipality of Broto, in Huesca province, Aragon, Spain. As of 2020, it has a population of 46.

Geography 
Buesa is located 85km north-northeast of Huesca.

References

Populated places in the Province of Huesca